Apaturia was an epithet given to more than one goddess in Greek mythology. The name meant "the deceitful".

Athena
The name Apaturia was given to the goddess Athena by Aethra, the mother of Theseus, who received a dream from Athena urging her to travel to the island of Sphairia to pour a libation for a charioteer of Pelops. After Aethra awoke she traveled to the island and was there raped by the god Poseidon.

Aethra later established there a temple to this aspect of the goddess, and started a custom where brides would offer up their maidenhood belts before marriage to Athena Apaturia. Athena Apaturia continued to be worshipped by the Troezenians in this manner.

Aphrodite
Apaturia was an epithet of the goddess Aphrodite at Phanagoria and other places in the Taurian Chersonesus, where it originated, according to tradition, in this way: Aphrodite was attacked by giants, and called Heracles to her assistance. He concealed himself with her in a cavern, and as the giants approached her one by one, she surrendered them to Heracles to kill them.

Notes

Epithets of Athena
Troezenian mythology
Epithets of Aphrodite